Jolgeh Zozan District is a district (bakhsh) in Khaf County, Razavi Khorasan province, Iran. At the 2006 census, its population was 18,928, in 4,062 families.  The district has one city: Qasemabad.  The district has two rural districts (dehestan): Keybar Rural District and Zozan Rural District.

The district also contains the UNESCO world heritage site of Zozan.

References 

Districts of Razavi Khorasan Province
Khaf County